The Coolmunda Dam is an earthfill embankment dam with a gated spillway across the Macintrye Brook, a tributary of the Dumaresq River, that is located on Darling Downs in Coolmunda, Goondiwindi Region, Queensland, Australia. The main purposes of the dam are for irrigation and potable water supply. The impounded reservoir is called the Lake Coolmunda.

Location and features
Two smaller creeks, Bracker Creek and Sandy Creek, also provide inflows to the reservoir.
 
The  dam wall holds back the  reservoir when at full capacity. The dam is managed by SunWater.

Recreational activities
There is one boat ramp, three picnic areas with good facilities as well as a caravan park. Free bush camping by the lake was once permitted.  In 2013, a new camping area was opened to the public.

There are no boating restrictions in place. Parts of the lake contain stretches of standing timber and along the northern bank there are submerged fence posts the demark a former creek bed.

Eel-tailed catfish and spangled perch are found naturally in the lake's waters and the Lake Coolmunda Restocking Group Inc. stocks it with murray cod, silver perch and golden perch. The introduced species european carp has also been found in the lake. A stocked impoundment permit is required to fish in the dam.

See also

List of dams in Queensland

References

External links 

Darling Downs
Dams completed in 1968
Dams in Queensland
1968 establishments in Australia
Embankment dams
Coolmunda, Lake
Dams in the Murray River basin